Jess Lee may refer to:

 Jess Lee (Canadian singer), Canadian Métis country music singer-songwriter
 Jess Lee (Malaysian singer) (born 1988), Malaysian singer
 Jess Lee (business) (born 1982), partner at Sequoia Capital and the former chief executive officer of Polyvore

See also 
 Jess Lee Brooks (1894–1944), American actor
 Jessica Lee (disambiguation)
 Jesse Lee (disambiguation)
 Jessie Lee (disambiguation)